The 2015 World Table Tennis Championships men's doubles was the 53rd edition of the men's doubles championship.

Chen Chien-an and Chuang Chih-yuan were the defending champions, but chose not to participate this year.

Xu Xin and Zhang Jike won the title by defeating Fan Zhendong and Zhou Yu 12–14, 11–7, 11–9, 9–11, 11–7, 11–9 in the final.

Seeds
Matches were best of 5 games in qualification and best of 7 games in the 64-player sized main draw.

  Chiang Hung-chieh /  Huang Sheng-sheng (second round)
  Kenta Matsudaira /  Koki Niwa (semifinals)
  Tang Peng /  Wong Chun Ting (third round)
  Chen Chien-an /  Chuang Chih-yuan (second round)
  Robert Gardos /  Daniel Habesohn (third round)
  Fedor Kuzmin /  Grigory Vlasov (second round)
  Xu Xin /  Zhang Jike (champions)
  Alexey Liventsov /  Mikhail Paikov (second round)
  Tan Ruiwu /  Wang Zengyi (second round)
  He Zhi Wen /  Carlos Machado (second round)
  Quadri Aruna /  Makanjuola Kazeem (second round)
  Jung Young-sik /  Kim Min-seok (quarterfinals)
  Lee Sang-su /  Seo Hyun-deok (semifinals)
  Kristian Karlsson /  Mattias Karlsson (third round)
  Fan Zhendong /  Zhou Yu (final)
  Masataka Morizono /  Yuya Oshima (quarterfinals)
  Timo Boll /  Ma Long (second round)
  David Powell /  Kane Townsend (first round)
  Tiago Apolónia /  João Monteiro (third round)
  Khalid Assar /  Omar Assar (second round)
  Simon Gauzy /  Emmanuel Lebesson (third round)
  Gao Ning /  Yang Zi (second round)
  Hugo Calderano /  Gustavo Tsuboi (third round)
  Adrien Mattenet /  Abdel-Kader Salifou (first round)
  Patrick Franziska /  Bastian Steger (second round)
  Mohamed El-Beiali /  El-sayed Lashin (first round)
  Chen Diogo /  Marcos Freitas (third round)
  Gustavo Gómez /  Manuel Moya (first round)
  Kim Hyok-bong /  Pak Sin-hyok (quarterfinals)
  Marko Jevtović /  Žolt Pete (second round)
  Gaston Alto /  Pablo Tabachnik (first round)
  Ho Kwan Kit /  Li Hon Ming (first round)

Draw

Finals

Top half

Section 1

Section 2

Bottom half

Section 3

Section 4

References

External links
Main draw
Qualifying draw

Men's doubles